The Suzuki World Rally Team, also known as the Suzuki WRC Challenge, was Suzuki's factory backed World Rally Championship team, as part of the Suzuki Sport organization. The team debuted for the first time at the 2007 Tour de Corse in France. After just one full season in 2008, in which the team finished fifth in the manufacturers' championship, Suzuki announced that they would be pulling out of the WRC. The decision was attributed to falling car sales caused by the economic crisis, although reports had surfaced that Suzuki were ready to abandon its WRC program before the economic downturn began.

History

JWRC (2002–2007)

In 2002 Suzuki began competing in the FIA Junior World Rally Championship with a Super 1600 version of the Ignis. The following year it won two events with Daniel Carlsson and in 2004 it won the FIA Junior World Rally Championship title with Per-Gunnar Andersson.
To gain experience of all the rallies in the series, Suzuki contested all 16-rounds of the WRC in 2005 and introduced a new model, the Swift S1600 in Finland. British driver Guy Wilks finished runner-up in that year's championship.
In 2007 the team had its best ever year in the J-WRC. Andersson won the title for the second time, while Urmo Aava finished second in the standings in an identical Swift S1600.

2007
Testing of the Suzuki SX4 WRC car was conducted in Japan in February 2007, before relocating to Europe in March. Gravel testing was undertaken in Southern France in April.

The Suzuki SX4 WRC made a competitive debut in Corsica, at the 2007 Tour de Corse, driven by Nicolas Bernardi and co-driver Jean-Marc Fortin, and set several stage times just outside the top ten. The team also participated in 2007 Rally GB with driver Sebastian Lindholm and co-driver Tomi Tuominen.

2008

Drivers for the 2008 season were announced Monday, December 17, to be Toni Gardemeister and Per-Gunnar Andersson. Technical Director Michel Nandan has been replaced by Shusuke Inagaki and Akira Kawada has been appointed as team manager.

Suzuki scored on their proper debut with Andersson finishing eighth in the 2008 Monte Carlo Rally, with Suzuki getting two points in the manufacturers' title race. In the 2008 Swedish Rally, Gardemeister finished seventh, earning Suzuki three more manufacturers' points. Both of these early races were marred by engine problems due to faulty head gaskets, with Gardemeister retiring from the Monte Carlo Rally and Andersson retiring from the Swedish Rally, before both cars retired from the Rally of Mexico.

After struggling with reliability issues for several rallies, Suzuki achieved their best result in New Zealand, with Andersson finishing sixth and Gardemeister seventh. At their home event, the 2008 Rally Japan, the team did even better and took fifth and sixth places. During a super special stage in the Sapporo Dome, Gardemeister also gave Suzuki and the SX4 WRC their first stage win. Andersson challenged for a podium in the early stages of Rally GB before going on to finish fifth, while Gardemeister finished seventh ahead of the works Ford of Mikko Hirvonen.

WRC Results

JWRC

WRC

Gallery

References

External links

Official website (Japanese)

Suzuki
World Rally Championship teams
European Rally Championship teams